The 1978 California gubernatorial election occurred on November 7, 1978. The Democratic incumbent, Jerry Brown, defeated the Republican nominee Attorney General Evelle J. Younger and independent candidate Ed Clark in a landslide.

Primary election summary
In the Republican gubernatorial primary, California Attorney General Evelle Younger (who was the only Republican elected to a statewide office in the post-Watergate Democratic onslaught in the 1974 California general election) defeated Ed Davis (State Senator and former Los Angeles Police Chief), Ken Maddy (State Senate Minority Leader from Fresno), and Pete Wilson (Mayor of San Diego). Incumbent Jerry Brown had only minor opposition in the Democratic Primary. The primary election included Proposition 13, the initiative authored by Howard Jarvis which sought to drastically reduce property taxes and change the way property taxes were calculated. Younger and most Republicans supported Proposition 13 while Brown and most Democrats opposed it. The initiative passed with 64.8% of the vote; it is still in effect, and many other states passed similar laws.

General election
The primary battle left Younger short of money, while Brown had a much larger campaign fund and won reelection in a landslide.

Results by county
Brown is the most recent Democratic California gubernatorial nominee to have won Butte, Calaveras, El Dorado, Fresno, Kern, Lassen, Madera, Mariposa,  Plumas, Shasta, Sierra, Siskiyou, Tehama, Tuolumne, and Yuba Counties. The Democratic gubernatorial candidate would not win Amador, Alpine, Kings, Merced, Riverside, Sacramento, San Bernardino, San Diego, San Joaquin, San Luis Obispo, Stanislaus, and Trinity Counties again until 1998, Nevada County again until 2014, and Orange County again until 2018.

References 

 California Elections Page

1978
1978 United States gubernatorial elections
Gubernatorial
November 1978 events in the United States
1978